The 2012 European general strike, first known as the 2012 Iberian Strike was a general strike called initially by Spanish and Portuguese unions on 14 November 2012, to whom several unions and collectives from other European countries joined in strike or other form of protests.

It was the first time in history that a European Union-wide series of strikes coincided in time. General strike was called in Cyprus, Malta, Portugal, Italy  and Spain, while protests and mobilizations of support occurred in France, Greece and in Wallonia, Belgium.

See also
 Anti-austerity movement  
 Great Recession in Europe 
 Impact of the Arab Spring
European sovereign debt crisis
Economic history of Europe
Anti-austerity movement in Spain (15-M Movement)
 Anti-austerity movement in Greece
 Anti-austerity protests in Ireland
 Anti-austerity protests in Portugal
 List of protests in the 21st century

References

General strikes
2012 in Spain
2012 in Portugal
2012 in Italy
2012 in France
2012 in Malta
Anti-austerity protests in the European Union
2012 in Greece
General strikes in Spain
2012 protests
Protests in Spain
Protests in Portugal
Protests in Greece
Protests in France
Protests in Italy
General strikes in Europe